The 12757 / 58 Kaghaznagar Express is a Superfast Express train belonging to Indian Railways – South Central Railway zone that runs between  &  in India.

It operates as train number 12757 from Secunderabad Junction to Sirpur Kaghaznagar and as train number 12758 in the reverse direction, serving the state of Telangana.

Coaches

The express has 1 AC Chair Car, 2 II Chair Cars, 17 General Unreserved & 2 SLR (Seating cum Luggage Rake) coaches. It does not carry a pantry car.

As is customary with most train services in India, coach composition may be amended at the discretion of Indian Railways depending on demand.

Service

As the average speed of the train is above, as per Indian Railway rules, its fare includes a Superfast surcharge.

Routing

The express runs from  via Bhongir, Jammikunta, Odela, Peddapalli Junction railway station, Ramagundam, Mancherial, Bellampalli and finally reaches terminating station .

Traction

As the route is fully electrified, a Lallaguda-based WAP-4 or WAP-7 locomotive powers the train for its entire journey.

Timings
The schedule is given below:-

Gallery

References

External links

Named passenger trains of India
Transport in Secunderabad
Rail transport in Telangana
Express trains in India